Qaleh-ye Mir Aqa (also Romanized as Qal‘eh-ye Mīr Āqā; also known as Qal‘eh-ye Mīrzā Āqā’ī) is a village in Hamaijan Rural District, Hamaijan District, Sepidan County, Fars Province, Iran. At the 2006 census, its population was 245, in 45 families.

References 

Populated places in Sepidan County